Plyoso is a rural locality (a village) in Lipetskoye Rural Settlement, Verkhovazhsky District, Vologda Oblast, Russia. The population was 28 as of 2002. There are 3 streets.

Geography 
Plyoso is located 53 km southwest of Verkhovazhye (the district's administrative centre) by road. Dubrova is the nearest rural locality.

References 

Rural localities in Verkhovazhsky District